Schwarzburg is a municipality in the valley of the Schwarza in the district Saalfeld-Rudolstadt in Thuringia, Germany.

It was first mentioned in 1071 as Swartzinburg. The (now-ruined) castle was from the 12th century the seat of the Counts of Schwarzburg. Then Rudolstadt became seat of the new line of Schwarzburg-Rudolstadt.

On 11 August 1919, while on holiday in Schwarzburg, Friedrich Ebert, the first Reichspräsident of Germany, signed the Weimar constitution, the first democratic constitution of Germany.

References

Saalfeld-Rudolstadt
Schwarzburg-Rudolstadt